Park Jin-woo (born July 3, 1983) is a South Korean actor.His instagram is jinwoo_731. He made his acting debut in 2004 with the romantic comedy My Little Bride and sitcom Nonstop 5. Park has since starred in films and television series such as Dasepo Naughty Girls (2006), Frivolous Wife (2008), I'll Give You Everything (2009), and Love On A Rooftop (2015).

Filmography

Film

Television series

References

External links 
 Park Jin-woo at Bel Actors Entertainment 
 Park Jin-woo Fan Cafe at Daum 
 
 
 

https://instagram.com/jinwoo_731?igshid=YmMyMTA2M2Y=

1983 births
Living people
South Korean male television actors
South Korean male film actors
Dongguk University alumni